Otha Jones III (born February 6, 2000) is an American professional boxer. As an amateur, he won two U.S. National Junior Championships, one U.S. National Youth Championships and represented the United States at the 2018 Youth Olympic Games at light welterweight. Otha Jones' sister, Oshae Jones is also a boxer.

Early life
Otha Jones III was born on February 6, 2000, in Toledo, Ohio. Before dedicating himself to boxing, Jones participated in wrestling, winning three state titles between the ages of 8 and 12. He first got into boxing at the age of 8 after his friend, Wayne "Pretty Boy Bam Bam" Lawrence Jr., also eight at the time, became a viral hit on YouTube after posting a video of himself boxing. Jones said of the video, "We were like eight years old and he [Bam Bam] got a million views on YouTube [by posting a video of himself boxing]. I was thinking, ‘I want a million views, too, man!’. So, I told my dad and ever since then, I’ve been in the gym." Jones is trained by his father, Otha Jones II and his older brother, Roshown Jones.

Amateur career
During an amateur career in which he compiled a record of 283–13, Jones won multiple national championships at the junior and youth level.

Professional career
On January 16, 2019, it was announced that Jones had signed a promotional contract with Eddie Hearn's Matchroom Boxing USA. He made his professional debut on March 9, 2019, winning via unanimous decision (UD) over six rounds against Girorgi Gelashvili at the Turning Stone Resort Casino in Verona, New York. Two judges scored the bout 58–55 while the third scored it 59–53. His second fight came three months later on June 21, scoring a first-round technical knockout (TKO) victory over Michael Horabin at the York Hall in London. Eight days after his bout with Horabin, Jones fought Matias Agustin Arriagada on June 29 at the Dunkin' Donuts Center in Providence, Rhode Island, winning by unanimous decision. All three judges scored the bout 60–54 in favour of Jones. The fight was part of the undercard for Demetrius Andrade's WBO title defense against Maciej Sulęcki. On October 12, 2019, as part of the undercard for Dmitry Bivol's WBA title defense against Lenin Castillo, Jones defeated Eric Manriquez by majority decision at the Wintrust Arena in Chicago. Two judges scored the bout in favour of Jones with 40–36 and 39–37, while the third scored it a draw at 38–38.

Professional boxing record

References

Living people
2000 births
American male boxers
Sportspeople from Toledo, Ohio
Boxers from Ohio
Lightweight boxers
Boxers at the 2018 Summer Youth Olympics